Berit Raith Puggaard (born 11 December 1972 in Copenhagen, Hovedstaden) is a former freestyle and butterfly swimmer from Denmark, who represented her native country at the 1992 and 1996 Summer Olympics. She also won the bronze medal at the 1997 European Championships in the 4 × 200 m Freestyle, alongside Ditte Jensen, Britt Raaby, and Mette Jacobsen.

References

1972 births
Living people
Danish female swimmers
Danish female butterfly swimmers
Olympic swimmers of Denmark
Swimmers at the 1992 Summer Olympics
Swimmers at the 1996 Summer Olympics
Swimmers from Copenhagen
Danish female freestyle swimmers
World Aquatics Championships medalists in swimming
European Aquatics Championships medalists in swimming
Puggaard family